El Paso Children's Hospital is a medical center in El Paso, Texas, that specializes in the treatment of children.

References

External links 
 

Buildings and structures in El Paso, Texas
Hospitals in Texas
Children's hospitals in the United States
Children's hospitals in Texas